Nocona Airport  was a public use airport located one nautical mile (2 km) southwest of the central business district of Nocona, a city in Montague County, Texas, United States. It was owned by the City of Nocona.

Facilities and aircraft 
Nocona Airport covered an area of 68 acres (28 ha) at an elevation of 905 feet (276 m) above mean sea level. It had one runway designated 14/32 with an asphalt surface measuring 3,200 by 50 feet (975 x 15 m).

For the 12-month period ending August 4, 2004, the airport had 100 general aviation aircraft operations.

References

External links 
  at Texas DOT Airport Directory
 Aerial image as of February 1995 from USGS The National Map
 Aeronautical chart at SkyVector

Defunct airports in Texas
Airports in Texas
Transportation in Montague County, Texas